Voice in the Wilderness is a 1991 Armenian drama film directed by Vigen Chaldranyan. It was entered into the 18th Moscow International Film Festival.

Cast
 Vigen Chaldranyan as Martiros
 Marine Ghukasyan as Colombina / Woman from East / Cornelia / Fortuneteller
 Mikael Pogosyan as Tomazo (as Mikael Poghosyan)
 Karen Dzhanibekyan as Yunus
 Ara Stepanyan as Old Armenian pilgrim
 Vladimir Msryan
 Rafael Kotanjyan
 Rudolf Gevondyan as Mustafa (as Rudolf Ghevondyan)

References

External links
 

1991 films
1991 drama films
Armenian-language films
Armenian drama films